Strigatella vexillum, common name : the vexillate mitre, is a species of sea snail, a marine gastropod mollusk in the family Mitridae, the miters or miter snails.

Description
The shell size varies between 25 mm and 86.5 mm

Distribution
This species is distributed in the Indian Ocean along East Africa and in the Central Pacific Ocean.

References

 Cernohorsky W. O. (1976). The Mitrinae of the World. Indo-Pacific Mollusca 3(17) page(s): 430

External links
 Gastropods.com : Mitra (Nebularia) vexillum; accessed : 11 December 2010

Mitridae
Gastropods described in 1844